20 – The Greatest Hits is the second greatest hits album by Italian singer Laura Pausini, released on 12 November 2013 by Warner Music Group. The album was also issued in a Spanish version, titled 20 – Grandes Exitos, and this edition received a nomination for a Lo Nuestro Award for Pop Album of the Year.

Background 
On 26 February 2013, in order to celebrate the twentieth anniversary of her career, Pausini released a digital single including the original versions in Italian, Spanish and English of the song which launched her career in 1993, "La solitudine". The track was launched as a limited-edition single, available for purchase for a week only. Later during the same year, she confirmed that a greatest hits album will be released for the same purpose by December 2013.

Working on the album began in April 2013, with recording and photo-shooting sessions taking place up to August. The album was confirmed in May 2013.

On 1 June 2013 Pausini took part in the concert Chime for Change in London, supporting the global campaign of the same name for girls' and women's empowerment. Pausini performed the songs "Io canto" and "It's Not Goodbye".
During the same year, she appeared as a featured artist on the track "Sonríe (Smile)", included in American singer Gloria Estefan's album The Standards.
A new world tour has also been confirmed by Pausini through her official website. Starting from December 2013, Pausini will promote her greatest hits album with concerts in her native Italy, as well as in other European countries, in Latin America, in the United States and in Canada. The tour also includes a performance during the Viña del Mar International Song Festival in Chile.

On 9 September 2013, Pausini released a new single named "Limpido" (in Spanish, "Limpio"), in order to promote her new album. The song is a duet between Pausini and the Australian singer Kylie Minogue. On the same day, the name of the album was confirmed to be 20 – The Greatest Hits. "Limpido" is the first single released on 9 September 2013.

On 20 September 2013, Pausini posted the official cover of this new album in her Instagram account, created in order to share the image.

The track list of the album was unveiled on 6 October 2013, in Pausini's official fan club. This is Pausini's first studio album that contains tracks in all the languages she has sung up to the moment: Italian, Spanish, French, English and Portuguese.

The second single of the album, "Se non te", was released on 4 November 2013.

Other releases from the album include the singles "Dove resto solo io", "Se fue" (with Marc Anthony), "Víveme" (with Alejandro Sanz) and "Surrender", the last one being released only in Australia.

On 22 July 2014, Pausini confirmed that she would be one of the four coaches of the fourth season of the Mexican reality show and singing competition La Voz. She also confirmed that by September that same year she would release a special version of the album's Spanish version to the hispanophone market, in a special edition that would contain three new duets: with Thalía in Sino a ti, Alex Ubago in Donde quedo solo yo and Melendi in Entre tu y mil mares.

Promotion 
To promote both this new album and her twentieth career anniversary, Pausini will embark in a series of concert shows around the world, entitled "The Greatest Hits World Tour".

Track listing

20 – The Greatest Hits

20 – Grandes Exitos

Standard Edition

Reissue

Bonus tracks

Song info 
Both versions of the album contain 38 tracks (18 in the first CD and 20 in the second one). Among which:
 3 ("Limpido / Limpio", "Se non te / Sino a ti" and "Dove resto solo io / Donde quedo solo yo") are completely new and written for this album (all these three tracks were chosen as the singles of the album).
 The first single of the album, "Limpido / Limpio", is included in its solo and duet versions with Kylie Minogue.
 2 ("Ramaya" and "Paola") are amateur recordings of Laura Pausini singing the famous song "Ramaya" when she was two years old (the former) and her daughter saying the word "mamma" (mommy) for the first time (the latter).
 4 ("You'll Never Find Another Love Like Mine", the Italian/Spanish language "Resta in Ascolto/Escucha Atento", "Un'emergenza d'amore" and "Ascolta il tuo cuore") of them are live recordings of Pausini during her previous world tours, except the first one, which was taken from Michael Bublé's live album "Caught in the Act".
 4 ("You'll Never Find Another Love Like Mine", "Te amaré", "Paris au mois d'août" and "Dare to live (Vivere)") are duets that Pausini performed with other singers but that were never included in any of her albums. The duets are with Michael Bublé, Miguel Bosé, Charles Aznavour and Andrea Bocelli, respectively.
 14 are old songs which were revisited.
 From these 14, 5 are songs in which Laura Pausini shares the vocals with another singer. With exception of "La solitudine", Ennio Morricone doesn't sing, but conducts the orchestra that plays in the song.
 The album's standard Italian edition contains 6 multilingual songs:
 1 track in Italian/Portuguese
 3 tracks in Italian/Spanish
 1 track in Italian/French
 2 tracks in Italian/English

Singles

Charts

Peak positions

Year-end charts

Certifications and sales

References 

Laura Pausini compilation albums
2013 greatest hits albums
Atlantic Records compilation albums
Italian-language compilation albums
Spanish-language compilation albums